Yosef Greenwald ( 1903 – Brooklyn 1984) was the second Rebbe of the Pupa Hasidic dynasty. Before World War II he was a rabbi and rosh yeshiva in Pápa, Hungary.

Greenwald was the son of Yaakov Yechezkiah Greenwald of Pupa and the grandson of Moshe Greenwald.

Greenwald was a Belzer Hasid. After the war he moved to Williamsburg, Brooklyn, and established the contemporary Pupa Hasidic movement.

Biography

Early life 
Greenwald was born on 16 September 1903 (24 Elul 5663) in Brezovica, Hungary, and studied in his father's yeshiva in Pápa, Hungary.

In 1925 he married his grandfather's niece Chana. She had been raised by her uncle Eliezer David Greenwald, whom Yosef Greenwald succeeded as the head of the Keren Ledovid Yeshiva.<ref name="MTP">{{cite web |url=http://www.mytzadik.com/tzadik.aspx?id=1014 |website=MyTzadik|title=אדמור רבי יוסף גרינוואלד מפאפא}}</ref>

 Rabbinical career 
After his father's death in 1941, Greenwald moved to Papa (Hungary), and began to serve as rabbi and Rosh Yeshivah. He brought additional students from Satmar to study in the yeshiva, and hid some sixty young men who fled from Slovakia and Poland.

 World War II and just after 
On 11 May 1944 Greenwald was sent to an Arbeitslager (Nazi labor camp), where his mother was murdered. Toward the end of World War II he hid in the Glass House in Budapest (Hungary).
His wife and ten children were murdered in the Holocaust. After the war he returned to Pápa and re-established the yeshiva.

He remarried after the war, and c. 1946 he moved with the yeshiva, which numbered approximately sixty young men, to Szombathely (Hungary), and later to Antwerp (Belgium), where he lived for several years.

 United States 
In 1950 Greenwald emigrated to the United States, settling in the Williamsburg section of Brooklyn with several students, where he founded the congregation "Kehilath Yaacov - Pupa", and continued as Admor of the Pupa Chassidut.

He became president of the Central Rabbinical Congress of the United States and Canada c. 1980.

 Death and legacy 
He died on August 11, 1984, after a stroke, and was succeeded by his son Yaakov Yechezkia Greenwald II.

His students included Gavriel Zinner and Yaakov Yitzhak Neumann.

 Works 
 Vaychi Yosef on the Torah
 Vaychi Yosef on Moadim
 Vaychi Yosef on Chanukah
 Vaychi Yosef on the Passover Haggadah
 Vaychi Yosef on tractate Mikvaot
 Responsa Vaya'an Yosef - on four parts of Shulchan Aruch
 Shyorei Mitzvah - printed in the books of his father Vayageid Yaakov
 pamphlet Kelach Shel Eizov - appendix to Haggadah Agudath Eizov
 pamphlet Keneh Bosem appendix to Sefer Arugat HaBoshem on EIChAI
 Pesach Tov - Sermons for the opening of the Yeshiva Zman''
 Darkei Yosef - Matters of Musar and the Fear of God

References

External links  
 kevarim.com, "Rebbe Yosef Greenwald"
 The Pupa Rav Drawing by Baruch Y Lebovits - Fine Art America

Greenwald family
1903 births
1984 deaths
20th-century American male writers
20th-century American rabbis
Hungarian Hasidic rabbis
People from Pápa
American Hasidic rabbis
20th-century Hungarian rabbis
Hasidic rebbes
Jewish concentration camp survivors
Orthodox rabbis from New York City
People from Williamsburg, Brooklyn
Writers from Brooklyn